Sentosa Fountain Gardens (or simply known as the Fountain Gardens) was a garden promenade attraction on the western part of Sentosa Island, Singapore, which opened in 1989.  It was located in the Imbiah Lookout zone of the island. The gardens and other features were demolished in 2007 for construction of the new Resorts World Sentosa, a large integrated style resort with new entertainment venues.

Features 

Start
The promenade began at the plaza of a fountain with a sculpted dragon statue. Its spouting snout faced the former Sentosa Ferry Terminal, welcoming new arrivals. The fountain was similar to another former dragon fountain that stood where the Tiger Sky Tower (former Carlsberg Sky Tower ) now rises. 

Route
The promenade's route passed by many smaller water features and European-style gardens.  

The gardens were inspired by the French formal gardens from the era of Louis XIV.  The elegant European-style gardens had over 25,000 plants, including palms, shrubs, bamboos, and vining creepers. 

At the top of the Fountain Gardens terrace, there is a replica of the Villa Gamberaia landscape, a renowned 17th-century Italian Renaissance garden near Florence, Italy. It had a mini-stage for small performances.  The gigantic  Merlion Statue, representing the mascot and national personification of Singapore, was prominently seen above the promenade. 

Finish
The 'Fountain Gardens' promenade terminus was at the entry gates of the former Sentosa Musical Fountain feature, a very large musical fountain grouping of coordinated individual jets and pools. Performances of water, mist, sound, light, lasers, flames, and animatronic 'host creatures' in computer 'choreographed' programs had scheduled showtimes.

References

Demolished buildings and structures in Singapore
Gardens in Singapore
Sentosa
Parks in Singapore
Buildings and structures demolished in 2007
1989 establishments in Singapore
2007 disestablishments in Singapore
Fountains in Singapore